Claudio Muccioli (born 8 April 1958) is a former captain-regent of San Marino. His term with Antonello Bacciocchi lasted from 1 October 2005 to 1 April 2006. He is a member of the San Marinese Christian Democratic Party.

References 

1958 births
Living people
Captains Regent of San Marino
Members of the Grand and General Council
Politicians of Catholic political parties
Sammarinese Christian Democratic Party politicians